Twin Lakes Dam (National ID # CO02045) is a dam in Lake County, Colorado, about 13 miles south of Leadville.

The earthen dam was constructed in 1978 by the United States Bureau of Reclamation with a height of 53 feet and a length at its crest of 3150 feet.  The dam is owned and operated by the Bureau as one element of its larger "transbasin" Fryingpan-Arkansas Project, which transfers available water from Colorado's West Slope across the Continental Divide to the more arid, and more populated, East Slope.

The reservoir it creates, Twin Lakes, is an enlargement of a natural glacial lake.  It has a surface area of 2700 acres and a maximum capacity of 141,000 acre-feet.
  Recreation includes boating, fishing for trout, and camping at five Forest Service campgrounds in the area (Dexter, Lakeview, Parry Peak, Twin Peaks and White Star).

References

External links
, the first Twin Lakes Dam (1898-1989)

Dams in Colorado
Reservoirs in Colorado
United States Bureau of Reclamation dams
Buildings and structures in Lake County, Colorado
Dams completed in 1978
Historic American Engineering Record in Colorado
Bodies of water of Lake County, Colorado
1978 establishments in Colorado